James Joseph Dalton (born 1864) was an Irish professional footballer who played as a full-back for Sunderland.

References

1864 births
Irish association footballers (before 1923)
Association football fullbacks
Sunderland A.F.C. players
Nelson F.C. players
English Football League players
Year of death missing